Mark Minenko (born March 29, 1957) is a former politician in Manitoba, Canada. He was a member of the Legislative Assembly of Manitoba from 1988 to 1990, representing the Winnipeg riding of Seven Oaks for the Manitoba Liberal Party.

Early years and education
He was born in New York City, New York. Minenko's father was the Very Rev. Tymofiy Minenko, a Ukrainian-born priest in the Ukrainian Orthodox Church; his mother was Anastasia Krywonos. He was raised in Winnipeg, and was educated at the University of Winnipeg and the University of Manitoba. He worked as a lawyer, and also joined the Canadian Forces Medical Services in 1976, eventually reaching the rank of captain. He was awarded the Canada Forces Decoration in 1988.

Political career
In 1981, Minenko worked as an assistant to MLA June Westbury, who was at the time the only Liberal representative in the provincial legislature.

Minenko first ran for provincial office in the election of 1988, scoring an upset victory over outgoing New Democratic Finance Minister Eugene Kostyra in Seven Oaks. Minenko won the election by 332 votes at a time when provincial support for the NDP was at its lowest ebb since the 1960s. He was named as Deputy Speaker on July 21, 1988, but resigned on May 18, 1989.

In the provincial election of 1990, redistribution forced him to run in the riding of St. Johns against another incumbent, New Democrat Judy Wasylycia-Leis. He lost, by almost two thousand votes, amid a general decline in support for the Liberal Party. He has not sought a return to provincial politics since this time.

Minenko later became active in the Ukrainian Canadian Congress and has sought a formal apology from the federal government for the detainment of Ukrainians in concentration camps during the First World War. He also continued his education at the University of Alberta, working towards a Master of Laws degree.

Election results

References

Manitoba Liberal Party MLAs
1957 births
Living people
Canadian people of Ukrainian descent